Roy Henderson may refer to:

Roy Henderson (baritone)
Roy Henderson (footballer)